Aleksandr Yanchenko (born 14 February 1995) is a Belarusian professional footballer who plays for Lokomotiv Gomel.

External links
 
 
 Profile at Gomel website

1995 births
Living people
Belarusian footballers
Association football forwards
FC Gomel players
FC Granit Mikashevichi players
FC Naftan Novopolotsk players
FC Lokomotiv Gomel players